Armenia is a village in the Cayo District of Belize, along the nation's Hummingbird Highway south of the capitol, Belmopan.

History
The first settlers in the area were immigrants from Guatemala, El Salvador, or Honduras, trying to escape the ravages of civil war. Both Mopan and K’ekchi Maya people also moved to the area from southern Belize in order to have better access to health care, transportation and a market in which to sell their crops.

Location and geographic setting
Armenia is set in the foothills of the Mayan Mountain Range and is surrounded by jungle, caves, rivers and wildlife.

Demographics
The village population of 1,395 residents is composed of both Spanish, Mestizo and Maya populations.

References

Populated places in Cayo District
Cayo South